The Giovi Pass is a pass in Italy in the northwestern Ligurian Apennines north of Genoa.

Geography 
The pass is at 472 metres (1,548 feet).

A railroad from Genoa to Turin and Milan runs through the pass via a tunnel that is 1,686 metres (5,531 feet) long.

Hiking 
The pass is also accessible by off-road mountain paths and is crossed by the Alta Via dei Monti Liguri, a long-distance trail from Ventimiglia (province of Imperia) to Bolano (province of La Spezia).

See also
 List of highest paved roads in Europe
 List of mountain passes

References

Other Sources

Webster's New Geographical Dictionary, Third Edition. Springfield, Massachusetts: Merriam-Webster, Inc., 1997. .

Giovi
Mountain passes of the Apennines